Honda pumps are portable pumps which are manufactured in Japan, India, China and the United States.

Pump Types
All Honda Power Equipment petrol-powered pumps utilize a Honda 4-stroke engine, while the submersible pumps use electricity to power the engine.

Volume
Volume (or Transfer) pumps are designed to pump a mass amount of clean water in an ecomical fashion.

References

Pumps
Honda